Astragalus aspindzicus, the Aspindzian astragalus, is a species of milkvetch that is endemic to the Meskheti region in southern Georgia. It can be found on dry stony places in the mid montane zone, between elevations of 1,500–1,800 m. It is threatened by agriculture and road construction.

References

aspindzicus
Endemic flora of Georgia (country)
Vulnerable plants